Vladimir Mikhaylovich Nevzorov (born October 5, 1952 in Maykop) is a Russian judoka who competed for the Soviet Union in the 1976 Summer Olympics.

Career 
In 1975, Nevzorov won the gold medal at the World Judo Championships in Vienna  in the half middleweight. The next year, he also won the Olympic gold medal in the same weight class.

In 1980 he became the coach of the Soviet national team. From 1989 to 1991 he worked in France for two years. In 1999 Nevzorov became head-coach of the Russian national judo team; a position he held until 2001. As such, he was the head coach of the Russian team at the 2000 Summer Olympics. Nevzorov later became vice-president of the Russian Judo federation.

References

External links
 

1952 births
Living people
Russian male judoka
Soviet male judoka
Olympic judoka of the Soviet Union
Olympic gold medalists for the Soviet Union
Olympic medalists in judo
Medalists at the 1976 Summer Olympics
Judoka at the 1976 Summer Olympics
Judoka trainers
People from Maykop
Sportspeople from Adygea